The Peace Party (PECP) is a political party in India. It became the sixth largest political party of India's most populous state, Uttar Pradesh, following the state legislative assembly elections of 2012. It won three seats in those elections. But failed to won any 1 of them in 2017 Elections. Ahead of 2022 Uttar Pradesh Legislative Assembly election Peace party of India formed an alliance with RUC.

The party was founded in February 2008 by Mohamed Ayub, who is a surgeon by profession and philanthropist.

It claims to fight for the rights of Muslim and dalits. It has organized many protest against Citizenship Amendment Act protests in Uttar Pradesh. Many Leaders of PECP are facing NSA charges on them due to incitation of communal riots in name of protest and posting communal ad which can lead to communal tension.

2012 UP Assembly Elections
The PECP contested around 208 Assembly seats in the 2012 Uttar Pradesh Legislative Assembly election, where it obtained 2.35 per cent of the vote and so ranked fifth by percentage of votes gained. Four candidates were successful in being elected:
Aneesurrehman, Kanth;
Dr. Mohd Ayub - Khalilabad
Kamal Yusuf Mallik - Domariyaganj
The Party is officially recognized as a State Party

2017 UP Assembly Elections

2022 UP Assembly Elections
The Peace Party and the Rashtriya Ulama Council (RUC) decided to contest the 2022 Uttar Pradesh Assembly elections together under the banner of the United Democratic Alliance.

During the announcement of the decision at a press conference, Peace Party chief Dr Ayub said that even after 74 years of Independence, Muslims had continued to be the “slaves” of secular parties.

Strategy  

The strategy of the PECP is to bring together other like-minded parties and groups, such as the, Bhartiya Samaj Party, Janvadi Party and National Lok Hit Party into one. It plants to expand its activities to other regions of India, including Bihar, Jharkhand, Uttrakhand, Delhi, Madhya Pradesh, Rajasthan, Maharashtra, Odisha, and Chhattisgarh. In 2015, the Delhi state unit of the party merged with the AAP, shortly before the 2015 Delhi polls. They have some presence in Muslim dominated areas of Eastern Uttar Pradesh.

Election symbol  
The party has been officially assigned the "glass of water" for its symbol for contesting elections.

Leadership  
Dr. Abdul Rasheed Ansari (National Vice President)
Er Mohammad irfan
Er Shadab Chauhan (National Spokesperson)
Maulana Kalimullah Faizi (National General Secretary And President of Ulma Group)
Hafiz Arbab Farooqui (National Secretary, president MCC, Domariyaganj, Siddharth Nagar)
Sanjay Gurjar (State President Of Uttar Pradesh)
Afroz Badal Jharkhand Co-Ordinator and 
National General Secretary
Riyaz khan National Secretary, Domariaganj
Mohd Akmal State Official Lucknow
Mohd Akram, Delhi State President
Azlal Khan, General Secretary, Maharashtra
Dr. Jahangir Alvi, General Secretary of Uttar Pradesh
Dr. Shamim Aabdi
Molana Safqat Taqi (General Secretary, Maharashtra Prabhari and spokesperson)
Abdur Rahman Chaudhary; (president Maharashtra state)
Maulana Gulzar Ahmad (National Spokesperson)
Swami Neki Maharaj (National Spokesperson)
Sayyed Mohammad Ahmad  (Communication Cell of Siddharth Nagar)
 Mohammad Mohsin Shaikh (President Mumbai)
 Faizan Ahmed Shaikh (Vice-president Mumbai)

Uttar Pradesh Legislative Assembly Election

References 

Official website

 
Political parties in Uttar Pradesh
Political parties established in 2008
2008 establishments in Uttar Pradesh